Rafael Valladares (born 28 June 1962) is a Honduran racewalker. He competed in the men's 20 kilometres walk at the 1988 Summer Olympics.

References

1962 births
Living people
Athletes (track and field) at the 1983 Pan American Games
Athletes (track and field) at the 1988 Summer Olympics
Honduran male racewalkers
Olympic athletes of Honduras
Place of birth missing (living people)
Pan American Games competitors for Honduras